A slick (noun form of the Hebrew root ס-ל-ק, "to remove") is a type of hiding place for weapons. They were used by the militant Zionist groups operating in Mandatory Palestine, including  Haganah, Lehi and Irgun. They were built all over the country in order to provide easy access to weapons, which were used to protect settlements and carry out offensive operations.

References

Rooms
Types of secret places